Peter or Pete Williams may refer to:

Academics
Peter Williams (musicologist) (1937–2016), English musicology professor and Bach scholar
Peter Williams (educationalist) (born 1948), British educationalist
Peter Damian Williams (born 1957), Australian historian

Arts and entertainment
Peter Williams (dance critic) (1914–1995), English ballet critic and writer
Peter Williams (American actor) (1915-2003), American-British actor
Jim Bowen (Peter Williams, 1937–2018), English stand-up comedian
Peter Williams (painter) (born 1952), American painter
Pete Williams (journalist) (born 1952), American journalist and television correspondent
Peter Williams (broadcaster) (born 1954), New Zealand television presenter
Peter Williams (actor) (born 1957), Jamaican actor
Pete Williams (musician) (born 1960), English musician
Peter Llewellyn Williams (born 1964), British stage and television actor
Peter Williams, fictional character the television series Titans
Pete Williams (fl. 2001), creator of the animated sitcom Undergrads

Politics and law
Harrison A. Williams (a.k.a. Pete Williams, 1919–2001), U.S. senator from New Jersey
Sir Peter Williams (lawyer) (1934–2015), New Zealand jurist
Peter Barry Williams (fl. 1980–1984), Commissioner of ICAC, Hong Kong

Religion
Peter Williams (Welsh Methodist) (1723–1796), leader of Welsh Methodism
Peter Bailey Williams (1763–1836), Welsh Anglican priest and amateur antiquarian
Peter Williams Jr. (1780–1840), African-American Episcopal priest

Science and medicine
Peter Williams (physician) (1925–2014), British physician
Sir Peter Williams (physicist) (born 1945), British physicist, chairman of Oxford Instruments; Chancellor, University of Leicester
Peter Francis Williams (active since 1999), Australian astronomer

Sports

Australian rules football
Peter Williams (Australian footballer, born 1867) (1867–1949), VFL footballer for Carlton
Peter Williams (Australian footballer, born 1944), VFL footballer for Fitzroy
Peter Williams (Australian footballer, born 1957), VFL footballer for Richmond

Cricket
Peter Williams (Irish cricketer) (1897–1971), Irish cricketer for Sussex and several other teams in England
Peter Williams (Australian cricketer) (born 1942), Australian cricketer, played for Victoria
Peter Williams (South African cricketer) (1957–2014), South African cricketer

Other sports
Peter Williams (rugby union, born 1884) (1884–1976), New Zealand rugby union international footballer
Peter Williams (English footballer) (born 1931), English footballer
Peter Williams (motorcyclist) (1939–2020), British motorcycle racer, participant in the Isle of Man TT, 1967
Peter Williams (rugby, born 1958), English rugby union and rugby league footballer
Pete Williams (basketball) (born 1965), American professional basketball player
Peter Williams (footballer, born 1960), Welsh association footballer
Peter Williams (swimmer) (born 1968), South African swimmer
Pete Williams (fighter) (born 1975), American mixed martial arts fighter
Petey Williams (born 1981), Canadian professional wrestler
Peter Williams (alpine skier) (born 1983), New Zealand para-alpine sit-skier
Peter Williams (cyclist) (born 1986), British racing cyclist

Others
Peter Williams (Medal of Honor) (1831–?), American Civil War sailor
Peter Gordon Williams (1920–1982), British businessman and unofficial member of the Legislative Council of Hong Kong
Peter D. Williams (born 1939), United States Marine Corps general and aviator
Peter Williams (businessman) (born 1974), British businessman, co-founder of Jack Wills clothing brand